Jay Hopler (November 23, 1970 – June 15, 2022) was an American poet.

Early life and education
Hopler was born in San Juan, Puerto Rico. He graduated from Purdue University (Ph.D., American Studies), the Iowa Writers’ Workshop (M.F.A., Creative Writing/Poetry), the Johns Hopkins Writing Seminars (M.A., Creative Writing/Poetry) and New York University (B.A., English and American Literature).

Career
His poetry, essays, and translations have appeared in numerous magazines and journals, including American Poetry Review, The Kenyon Review, Mid-American Review, The New Republic and The New Yorker.

Hopler was Professor of English (Creative Writing/Poetry) at the University of South Florida.

Personal life
Hopler was married to poet and Renaissance scholar Kimberly Johnson.

Death

On 15 June 2022, Hopler died in Salt Lake City, Utah, after a battle with prostate cancer.

Awards

 2005 Yale Series of Younger Poets Award, for Green Squall, chosen by Louise Glück
 2006 ForeWord Magazine Book of the Year Award for Green Squall
 2006 Florida Book Award for Green Squall
 2007 Great Lakes Colleges Association New Writers Award, for Green Squall
 2007 National “Best Books” Award from USA Book News for Green Squall
 2009 Lannan Foundation Fellowship
 2009 Whiting Award
 2010/2011 Rome Prize in Literature from the American Academy of Arts & Letters/The American Academy in Rome
 2014 National “Best Books” Award from USA Book News for Before the Door of God: An Anthology of Devotional Poetry
 2016 Florida Book Award in Poetry (Gold Medal) for The Abridged History of Rainfall
 2016 Finalist, National Book Award in Poetry for The Abridged History of Rainfall

Works

Anthologies
  
  ( Canongate Books 1996)

References

External links

Profile at The Whiting Foundation

1970 births
2022 deaths
American male poets
Iowa Writers' Workshop alumni
New York University alumni
University of South Florida faculty
Yale Younger Poets winners
21st-century American poets
21st-century American male writers
People from San Juan, Puerto Rico